Yorktown Refinery was an oil refinery in Virginia located alongside of the York River built in 1956.  It is now used by Plains All American Pipeline LP as a rail and water oil terminal.

The refinery used to be operated by Giant Industries and earlier operated by BP/Amoco. Giant Industries was acquired by Western Refining in 2007.  The refinery could run high TAN crude oil (crude oil with a high content of naphthenic acids). The refining operations were shut down in the fall of 2010 and the refinery was later demolished.

References

External links 
 Giant Industries
 CNN Money profile

Energy infrastructure completed in 1956
Oil refineries in the United States
Energy infrastructure in Virginia